Elout, sometimes spelled with numerous alternative spellings, is a Dutch surname, and can refer to:

 François Elout (1519-1600), Belgian/Dutch painter.
 François Elout (1589-1635), Dutch painter.
 Cornelis Elout (1714 - 1779), collector and member of Teylers Tweede Genootschap.
 Cornelis Pieter Elout (1741 - 1796), manufacturer and council member of Haarlem. Son of Cornelis Elout.
 Cornelis Theodorus Elout (1767 - 1841), Dutch cabinet minister. 
 Cornelis Pieter Jacob Elout (1795 - 1843), Dutch Major General and resident in the Dutch Indies. Son of Cornelis Theodorus Elout. 
 Maurits Theodorus Elout (1808 - 1889), Dutch military during the Belgian independence struggle. Son of Cornelis Theodorus Elout.
 Cornelis Hendrik Elout, Dutch politician and mayor of Domburg. 
 Cornelis Karel Elout (1870 - 1947), Dutch journalist and writer. Son of Cornelis Hendrik Elout. 
 Mies Elout Soeterwoude-Drabbe (1875 - 1956), Dutch painter and drawer.
 Johanna Madeleine Selleger-Elout (1875 - 1957), Dutch writer.